The Grawemeyer Awards are five awards given annually by the University of Louisville. The prizes are presented to individuals in the fields of education, ideas improving world order, music composition, religion, and psychology. The religion award is presented jointly by the University of Louisville and the Louisville Presbyterian Theological Seminary. Initially, the awards came with a bonus of US$150,000 each, making them among the most lucrative in their respective fields. This cash prize increased to $200,000 beginning in 2000 but the award amount dropped to $100,000 in 2011 after the fund for the prize lost money due to a drop in the stock market.

The first award, for Music Composition, was presented in 1985. The award for Ideas Improving World Order was added in 1988 and Education in 1989. In 1990, a fourth award, Religion, was added as a joint prize between the university and the Louisville Presbyterian Theological Seminary. Psychology was added in 2000; the first award was given in 2001.

In 2015 a special award, the Spirit Award, created for the award's thirtieth anniversary, was presented to former boxer Muhammad Ali.

Some of the most notable winners include former Soviet President Mikhail Gorbachev (world order); Academy Award-winning composer Tan Dun (music composition); German theologian Jürgen Moltmann (religion); Aaron Beck, considered the founder of cognitive therapy (psychology); and former Andrew W. Mellon Foundation and Princeton University President William G. Bowen and former Harvard University President Derek Bok (education).

H. Charles Grawemeyer (1912–1993), industrialist, entrepreneur, astute investor and philanthropist, created the awards at the University of Louisville in 1984. An initial endowment of $9 million from the Grawemeyer Foundation funded the awards, which have drawn thousands of nominations from around the world.

Although Grawemeyer was a chemical engineer by schooling, the University of Louisville graduate cherished the liberal arts and chose to honor powerful ideas in five fields in performing arts, the humanities, and the social sciences.

Grawemeyer distinguished the awards by honoring ideas rather than lifelong or publicized personal achievement. He also insisted that the selection process for each of the five awards—though dominated by professionals—include one step involving a lay committee knowledgeable in each field. As Grawemeyer saw it, great ideas should be understandable to someone with general knowledge and not be the private treasure of academics.

Recipients

Education

Improving world order

Music composition

Psychology

Religion

Spirit Award

See also

 List of psychology awards
 List of religion-related awards

References

External links
 

Awards established in 1985
University of Louisville
1985 establishments in Kentucky
American education awards
American music awards
American psychology awards
Religion-related awards
Peace awards